Graham Stuart Botting (27 June 1915 – 7 March 2007) was a New Zealand cricketer and hockey player.

Botting was a wicket-keeper who played in the Plunket Shield for Central Districts from 1950–51 to 1952–53 and Otago in 1953–54. He also played for Nelson in the Hawke Cup from 1945–46 to 1952–53.

While playing hockey for Otago he represented New Zealand in 1938.

A schoolteacher, Botting taught at Nelson College.

See also
 List of Otago representative cricketers

References

External links
 

1915 births
2007 deaths
Central Districts cricketers
New Zealand cricketers
New Zealand male field hockey players
Otago cricketers